Tytthoscincus is a genus of skinks. Originally defined to include a few species from the Philippines, the genus now includes many species from South-East Asia in general.

Description
The temporal scales are small and of same size and shape as the lateral body scales (as opposed to being enlarged and shield-like). The digits are small.

Species
The following 22 species, listed alphabetically by specific name, are recognized as being valid:

Tytthoscincus aesculeticola (Inger, Lian, Lakim, & Yambun, 2001) 
Tytthoscincus atrigularis (Stejneger, 1908) – Zamboanga sphenomorphus
Tytthoscincus batupanggah Karin, Das, & Bauer, 2016 – cursed-stone diminutive leaf-litter skink
Tytthoscincus biparietalis (Taylor, 1918) – Sulu sphenomorphus
Tytthoscincus bukitensis Grismer, 2007 – Fraser's Hill forest skink
Tytthoscincus butleri (Boulenger, 1912) – Butler's forest skink
Tytthoscincus hallieri (Lidth De Jeude, 1905) 
Tytthoscincus ishaki Grismer, 2006 – Tioman Island forest skink
Tytthoscincus jaripendek Grismer, Wood, Quah, Anuar, Ngadi, Mohd-Izam, & Ahmad, 2017 – Cameron Highlands forest skink
Tytthoscincus kakikecil Grismer, Wood, Quah, Anuar, Ngadi, Mohd-Izam, & Ahmad, 2017 – Fraser's Hill forest skink
Tytthoscincus keciktuek Grismer, Wood Jr., Ahmad, Baizul-Hafsyam, Afiq-Shuhaimi, Rizal, & Quah, 2018 – Sungai Peres forest skink
Tytthoscincus leproauricularis Karin, Das, & Bauer, 2016 – scaly-eared diminutive leaf-litter skink
Tytthoscincus martae Grismer, Wood, Quah, Anuar, Ngadi, Mohd-Izam, & Ahmad, 2017 – Hindu Temple forest skink
Tytthoscincus monticolus Grismer, Wood Jr., Ahmad, Baizul-Hafsyam, Afiq-Shuhaimi, Rizal, & Quah, 2018 – Sungai Bubu forest skink
Tytthoscincus panchorensis Grismer, Muin, Wood Jr., Anuar, & Linkem, 2016 – Bukit Panchor forest skink
Tytthoscincus parvus (Boulenger, 1897)
Tytthoscincus perhentianensis Grismer, Wood, & Grismer, 2009 – Perhentian Island forest skink
Tytthoscincus sibuensis Grismer, 2006 – Sibu Island forest skink
Tytthoscincus temasekensis Grismer, Wood Jr., Lim, & Liang, 2017 – Singapore swamp skink
Tytthoscincus temengorensis Grismer, Ahmad, & Onn, 2009 – Temengor forest skink
Tytthoscincus temmincki (Dumeril & Bibron, 1839)
Tytthoscincus textus (Muller, 1894)

Nota bene: A binomial authority in parentheses indicates that the species was originally described in a genus other than Tytthoscincus.

References

Lizard genera
Tytthoscincus
Lizards of Asia
Taxa named by Rafe M. Brown
Taxa named by Arvin Cantor Diesmos
Taxa named by Charles W. Linkem